The Großer Eutiner See is a lake in Holstein Switzerland, Schleswig-Holstein, Germany. It lies northeast of the town of Eutin.

It northern side borders directly on the woods of the Seeschaarwald. In the western part of the lake,  separated by the Bebensund Bridge, the Fissauer Bucht, its main inflow, the River Schwentine enters, and then leaves again a little further west. For boating enthusiasts the Schwentine is only navigable upstream as far as the Großer Eutiner See.

There are two islands in the Großer Eutiner See:
Pheasant Island (Fasaneninsel) on which the origins of the settlement in that area are located, and which used to be a visual axis point for the former Baroque garden at Eutin Castle and which has been re-occupied today and is in private hands, and the so-called Liebesinsel ("Love Island").

Musicals take place during the summer in the castle garden on the shore of the Großer Eutiner See.

See also 
List of lakes in Schleswig-Holstein

External links 

 Round trips on the Großer Eutiner See 
 Eutin Summer Games 

Lakes of Schleswig-Holstein
LEutinersee, Grosser 
Ostholstein
Grosser Eutiner See